"Elveskud" or "Elverskud" (Danish for "Elf-shot") is the Danish, and most widely used, name for one of the most popular ballads in Scandinavia (The Types of the Scandinavian Medieval Ballad A 63 'Elveskud — Elf maid causes man's sickness and death'; Danmarks gamle Folkeviser 47; Sveriges Medeltida Ballader 29; NMB 36; CCF 154; IFkv 1).

Origins and distribution

The origins of the ballad are agreed to be considerably earlier than the earliest manuscripts, in the Middle Ages, but there is little consensus beyond this. Many scholars suggest a Breton or French origin but the routes by which it came to and was disseminated within Northern Europe are unknown.

The ballad has close parallels across Europe (the closest English-language parallel being "Clerk Colvill"). The earliest surviving manuscript is Karen Brahes Folio, a Danish manuscript from the 1570s; the earliest surviving Swedish version is from the 1670s. At least seventy Scandinavian variants are known; over forty come from Denmark, and seventeen from Sweden.

It is also widely known as:

 "Herr Olof och Älvorna" ("Sir Olof and the Elves", Swedish). 
 "Elf-Qvinnan och Herr Olof" ("The Elf-Woman and Sir Olof", Swedish).
 "Kvæði af Ólafi liljurós" ("Song of Ólafur lily-rose", Icelandic).
 "Olaf liljekrans" ("Olaf lily-wreath", Norwegian).
 "Ólavur riddarrós og álvarmoy" ("Ólavur knight-rose and the elf-maiden", Faroese).

Summary

In the summary of The Types of the Scandinavian Medieval Ballad,

 Olav rides out at dawn and comes upon elves dancing in the woods. One of the elf maids invites him to dance with her, but he refuses and tells her that he is to be married the next day. She puts a fatal sickness on him. When he comes home he is dying. He expresses his last wishes.

Not all versions precisely fit this summary. For example, in many Danish versions, Olav does dance with the elves, sometimes to death; in some versions in Denmark, Norway and Sweden Olav's death is at first concealed from his bride, but eventually she finds out; in the Icelandic versions, the bride is not mentioned at all, and Olav's refusal to dance arises from his Christian faith. In one Faroese variant, Olav is implied to have been romantically involved with the elf-woman for some time; it also begins with his mother predicting his death.

Vésteinn Ólason's summary of the Icelandic variants of the ballad, generally known as "Kvæði af Ólafi liljurós", is

 Ólafur rides along a rocky hillside, meets four elf-maidens who welcome him and invite him to drink (or live) with them. He refuses to live with the elves and would rather believe in God (Christ). One of the elf-maidens asks him to wait, and goes to fetch a sword which she hides under her clothing as she asks him for a kiss. When Ólafur bends down to kiss her, she thrusts the sword under his shoulderblade to his heart. Ólafur spurs his horse and rides home to his mother; she asks why he is so pale; (he hedges at first); tells the truth; asks his mother to make his bed and his sister to dress the wounds. Thereupon he dies (and is buried along with his mother and sister(?)).

Text

The most widely known version of "Elveskud" is that published by Peder Syv in 1695, given here in modernised spelling:

Translations

These and other available translations by Borrow, Prior, etc., are listed in Syndergaard's survey:

 "Elfin Shaft", 
 "Sir Oluf and the Elf-king's daughter", 
 "Sir Olof in Elve-Dance" and "The Elf-Woman and Sir Olof" (two versions)).
 "Sir Olof and the Elves",

References in popular culture

The ballad has inspired a very large number of reworkings in popular culture.

Most famously, a translation of a Danish variant (DFG 47B, from Peter Syv's 1695 edition) into German by Johann Gottfried Herder as "Erlkönigs tochter" inspired Johann Wolfgang von Goethe's poem "Der Erlkönig", which developed the concept of the Erlking.

The ballad was one of the inspirations for the 1828 play Elves' Hill by Johan Ludvig Heiberg.

Other works inspired by "Elveskud" include Henrik Ibsen's 1856 play Olaf Liljekrans; Kristín Marja Baldursdóttir's 1995 novel Mávahlátur; Böðvar Guðmundsson's 2012 novel Töfrahöllin; and Steeleye Span's folk-rock song Dance with Me.

References

See also
Elf-shot

Scandinavian folklore
Ballads
Songs
Folk
Danish folk music
Nordic folk music
Norwegian folk music
Year of song unknown
Swedish folk songs
Songwriter unknown